Ulotrichopus primulina is a moth of the  family Erebidae. It is found in Botswana, Cape Verde, Democratic Republic of Congo (Orientale, Katanga), Ethiopia, Kenya, Madagascar, Malawi, Mauritania, Somalia, South Africa and Tanzania.

References

Ulotrichopus
Moths of Africa
Moths of Cape Verde
Moths described in 1902